The canton of Creil is an administrative division of the Oise department, northern France. It was created at the French canton reorganisation which came into effect in March 2015. Its seat is in Creil.

It consists of the following communes:
Creil
Verneuil-en-Halatte

References

Cantons of Oise